The 2000 Kmart 400 was the 14th stock car race of the 2000 NASCAR Winston Cup Series and the 32nd iteration of the event. The race was held on Sunday, June 11, 2000, in Brooklyn, Michigan, at Michigan International Speedway, a two-mile (3.2 km) moderate-banked D-shaped speedway. The race was shortened from its scheduled 200 laps to 194 due to inclement weather. At race's end, Tony Stewart, driving for Joe Gibbs Racing, would manage to hold off the field until lap 193 when the race was stopped for rain. The win was Stewart's fifth career NASCAR Winston Cup Series win and his second of the season. To fill out the podium, Dale Earnhardt of Richard Childress Racing and Bobby Labonte of Joe Gibbs Racing would finish second and third, respectively.

Background 

The race was held at Michigan International Speedway, a two-mile (3.2 km) moderate-banked D-shaped speedway located in Brooklyn, Michigan. The track is used primarily for NASCAR events. It is known as a "sister track" to Texas World Speedway as MIS's oval design was a direct basis of TWS, with moderate modifications to the banking in the corners, and was used as the basis of Auto Club Speedway. The track is owned by International Speedway Corporation. Michigan International Speedway is recognized as one of motorsports' premier facilities because of its wide racing surface and high banking (by open-wheel standards; the 18-degree banking is modest by stock car standards).

Entry list 

 (R) denotes rookie driver.

Practice

First practice 
The first practice session was held on Friday, June 9, at 10:15 AM EST, and would last for one hour and 40 minutes.

Second practice 
The second practice session was held on Friday, June 9, at 1:00 PM EST, and would last for an hour and 30 minutes.

Third practice 
The third practice session was held on Saturday, June 10, at 9:30 AM EST, and would last for one hour.

Fourth and final practice 
The fourth and final practice session, sometimes referred to as Happy Hour, was held on Saturday, June 10, after the preliminary 2000 Flagstar 200 ARCA Re/Max Series race, and lasted for up to an hour.

Around 38 minutes into the session, Elliott Sadler would suffer a blowover crash after blowing a right-rear tire, flipping around a dozen times. It was later revealed that the car barrel rolled higher than the catch fencing, and the majority of footage of the crash was subsequently destroyed. While bruised, Elliott would still race with a backup.

Qualifying 
Qualifying was split into two rounds. The first round was held on Friday, June 2, at 3:30 PM EST. Each driver would have two laps to set a fastest time; the fastest of the two would count as their official qualifying lap. During the first round, the top 25 drivers in the round would be guaranteed a starting spot in the race. If a driver was not able to guarantee a spot in the first round, they had the option to scrub their time from the first round and try and run a faster lap time in a second round qualifying run, held on Saturday, June 3, at 11:30 AM EST. As with the first round, each driver would have two laps to set a fastest time; the fastest of the two would count as their official qualifying lap. Positions 26-36 would be decided on time, while positions 37-43 would be based on provisionals. Six spots are awarded by the use of provisionals based on owner's points. The seventh is awarded to a past champion who has not otherwise qualified for the race. If no past champion needs the provisional, the next team in the owner points will be awarded a provisional.

Three drivers would fail to qualify: Darrell Waltrip, Ricky Craven, and Dave Marcis.

Full qualifying results

Race results

References 

2000 NASCAR Winston Cup Series
NASCAR races at Michigan International Speedway
June 2000 sports events in the United States
2000 in sports in Michigan